The Polish pavilion houses Poland's national representation during the Venice Biennale arts festivals.

Background

Organization and building 

The pavilion was originally designated for Venetian decorative arts as part of Brenno Del Giudice's Sant'Elena Island complex designed and built in 1932.

Representation by year

Art 

 1970 — Jozef Szajna, " Reminiscences"
 1980 — Magdalena Abakanowicz, "Embryology"
 1993 — Mirosław Bałka, "Soap Corridor"
 1995 — Roman Opalka
 1999 — Katarzyna Kozyra, "Men's Bathhouse" (honorary mention)
 2003 — Stanisław Dróżdż, "ALEA IACTA EST" project (Curator: Paweł Sosnowski)
 2005 — Artur Żmijewski, " Repetition"
 2007 — Monika Sosnowska, "1:1" (Curator: Sebastian Cichocki)
 2009 — Krzysztof Wodiczko, " Guests " (Curator: Bożena Czubak)
 2011 — Yael Bartana, "And Europe will be stunned" (Curators: Sebastian Cichocki, Galit Eilat)
 2013 — Konrad Smolenski, "Everything was forever until it was no more" audio installation (Curators: Agnieszka Pindera, Daniel Muzyczuk)
 2015 — Joanna Malinowska and C. T. Jasper, "Halka/Haiti 18°48’05″N 72°23’01″W"(Curator: Magdalena Moskalewicz)
 2017 — Sharon Lockhart, "Little Review" (Curator: Barbara Piwowarska)
 2019 — Roman Stańczak (Curators: Łukasz Mojsak, Łukasz Ronduda)
 2022 — Małgorzata Mirga-Tas (Curators: Wojciech Szymański and Joanna Warsza)

References

Bibliography

Further reading

External links 

 

National pavilions
Polish contemporary art